5-MeO EiPT is a psychedelic of the tryptamine class that has been sold online as a designer drug.

Legality
5-MeO-EiPT is illegal in Japan.
5-MeO-EiPT is illegal in Italy.
Sweden's public health agency suggested classifying 5-MeO-EiPT as a hazardous substance, on May 15, 2019.

See also
 5-MeO-DALT
 5-MeO-DET
 5-MeO-DiPT
 5-MeO-DMT
 5-MeO-DPT
 5-MeO-MiPT
 EiPT

References

Designer drugs
Psychedelic tryptamines